Christopher Eccleston (born 16 February 1964) is an English actor. A twice BAFTA Award nominee, he is best known for his television and film work, which includes his role as the ninth incarnation of the Doctor in the BBC sci-fi series Doctor Who (2005), playing Matt Jamison in The Leftovers (2014–2017), and his collaborations with filmmakers Danny Boyle and Michael Winterbottom.

Eccleston trained at the Royal Central School of Speech and Drama in London and made his professional acting debut onstage in a Bristol Old Vic production of A Streetcar Named Desire. He garnered attention for his film roles as Derek Bentley in Let Him Have It (1991) and David Stevens in Shallow Grave (1994), and for his television performances in Cracker (1993–1994) and Hillsborough (1996). His BAFTA Award-nominated performance as Nicky Hutchinson in the BBC miniseries Our Friends in the North (1996) established him as a household name in the United Kingdom, and he followed the role with appearances in the films Jude (1996), A Price Above Rubies (1998), Elizabeth (1998), eXistenZ (1999), Gone in 60 Seconds (2000), The Invisible Circus (2001), The Others (2001), 24 Hour Party People (2002), and 28 Days Later (2002), as well as television roles including the drama series Clocking Off (2000) and a second BAFTA Award-nominated performance as Stephen Baxter in the ITV drama series The Second Coming (2003).

Eccleston garnered widespread attention and acclaim for his role in the 2005 revival of Doctor Who, becoming the first to play the title character since 1996. He departed the role after just one series, for which he won a National Television Award and received nominations for a Broadcasting Press Guild Award and BAFTA Cymru Award. He has since appeared in the television series Heroes (2007), The Shadow Line (2011), Blackout (2012), Lucan (2013), The Leftovers (2014–2017), Safe House (2015), Fortitude (2015), and The A Word (2016–2020) and films such as G.I. Joe: The Rise of Cobra (2009), Amelia (2009), Song for Marion (2012), Thor: The Dark World (2013) and Legend (2015). He won an International Emmy Award for his performance in an episode of the anthology series Accused. On stage, he has played the title roles in productions of Hamlet and Macbeth and starred in productions of Miss Julie, A Doll's House, and Antigone. Since 2017, he has narrated the documentary series Ambulance.

Early life
Eccleston was born on 16 February 1964 into a working-class family in the Langworthy area of Salford, Lancashire, the son of Elsie and Ronnie Eccleston. He has two brothers named Alan and Keith, twins who are eight years older than him. On his religious upbringing, he has said, "My dad's family were Catholic. My mum was very Church of England – still is – but it doesn't work for me." The family lived in a small terraced house on Blodwell Street before moving to Little Hulton when Eccleston was seven months old. He attended Joseph Eastham High School, where he became head boy.

At the age of 19, Eccleston was inspired to pursue acting by such television dramas as Boys from the Blackstuff. He completed a two-year Performance Foundation Course at Salford Tech, then went on to train at the Central School of Speech and Drama. He was influenced in his early years by Ken Loach's film Kes and Albert Finney's performance in the film Saturday Night and Sunday Morning, but he soon found himself performing the classics, including the works of William Shakespeare, Anton Chekhov, and Molière. At the age of 25, he made his professional stage debut in the Bristol Old Vic's production of A Streetcar Named Desire. Underemployed as an actor for some years after graduating from college, he took a variety of odd jobs at a supermarket, on building sites, and as an artist's model.

Career

Early work (1991–2005)

Eccleston first came to public attention as Derek Bentley in the film Let Him Have It (1991), and the Inspector Morse episode "Second Time Around" (1991). In 1992, he played the role of Sean Maddox in the BBC drama miniseries Friday on my Mind. A regular role in the Granada Television production Cracker (1993–94) brought him recognition in the UK; and, after he told TV bosses of his desire to leave the series, they killed off his character in October 1994, making him a victim of the serial killer Albie Kinsella (Robert Carlyle). At around the same time, Eccleston appeared in the episode "One, Two, Buckle My Shoe" of the Poirot series adapted from mysteries by Agatha Christie.

He appeared in the low-budget Danny Boyle film Shallow Grave (1994), in which he co-starred with actor Ewan McGregor. The same year, he won the part of Nicky Hutchinson in the epic BBC drama serial Our Friends in the North, whose broadcast on BBC Two in 1996 helped make him a household name in the UK. Eccleston starred in an ensemble cast that included actors Mark Strong and Gina McKee, as well as Daniel Craig. In 1996, he took the part of Trevor Hicks—a man who lost both of his daughters in the 1989 Hillsborough disaster—in the television drama film Hillsborough, penned by Jimmy McGovern. In real life, he was the best man to Trevor Hicks at his wedding in March 2009.

His film career has since taken off with a variety of roles, including Jude (1996), Elizabeth (1998), eXistenZ (1999), Gone in 60 Seconds (2000), The Others (2001), 24 Hour Party People (2002) and 28 Days Later (2002). He played a major role as the protagonist of the 2002 Revengers Tragedy, adapted from Thomas Middleton's play of the same name. He starred in the independent films A Price Above Rubies (1998) and The Invisible Circus (2001). He appeared in the car-heist film Gone in 60 Seconds, but did not take his driving test until January 2004. He said on BBC's Top Gear that his licence restricts him to vehicles with automatic transmission.

He has appeared in a variety of television roles, especially in British dramas. These have included Hearts and Minds (1995) for Channel 4, Clocking Off (2000) and Flesh and Blood (2002) for the BBC and Hillsborough (1996), a modern version of Othello (2001), playing 'Ben Jago', (the Iago character); and the religious telefantasy epic The Second Coming (2003) for ITV, in which he played Steve Baxter, the son of God. He has made guest appearances in episodes of the comedy-drama Linda Green (2001) and macabre sketch show The League of Gentlemen (2002). Eccleston appeared in a stage role in Hamlet in the 2002 production at Leeds's West Yorkshire Playhouse. March–April 2004 saw him return to the venue in a new play, Electricity.

Eccleston has been twice nominated in the Best Actor category at the British Academy Television Awards. His first nomination came in 1997 for Our Friends in the North, but he lost to Nigel Hawthorne (for The Fragile Heart). He was nominated in 2004 for The Second Coming; Bill Nighy won for State of Play. Eccleston won the Best Actor category at the 1997 Broadcasting Press Guild Awards for Our Friends in the North. In 2003 he won the RTS Best Actor award for a second time, for his performance in Flesh and Blood. In July 2004, a poll of industry experts, conducted by Radio Times magazine, voted Eccleston the "19th Most Powerful Person in Television Drama."

Doctor Who (2005) 
On 2 April 2004, it was announced that Eccleston was to play the ninth incarnation of the Doctor in the revival of the BBC science fiction television series Doctor Who. The first series began transmission on 26 March 2005. Eccleston is the first actor to play the role who was born after the series began. On 30 March, the BBC released a statement, ostensibly from Eccleston, saying that he had decided to leave the role after just one series, because he feared becoming typecast. On 4 April, the BBC revealed that the statement had been falsely attributed and released without Eccleston's consent. The BBC admitted that they had broken an agreement made in January not to disclose publicly that he only intended to do one series. The statement had been made after journalists made queries to the press office.

Following his departure, Eccleston was replaced by David Tennant, who played the Tenth Doctor from 2005 to 2010. 

On 11 June 2005, during a BBC radio interview, when asked if he had enjoyed working on Doctor Who, Eccleston responded by saying, "Mixed, but that's a long story." Eccleston's reasons for leaving the role continue to be debated in Britain's newspapers: on 4 October 2005 Alan Davies told The Daily Telegraph that Eccleston had been "overworked" by the BBC, and had left the role because he was "exhausted". Eccleston later stated that he left the show because he "didn't enjoy the environment and the culture that the cast and crew had to work in", but that he was proud of having played the role. Eccleston said in a subsequent interview, "My relationship with my three immediate superiors – the showrunner, the producer and co-producer – broke down irreparably during the first block of filming and it never recovered."

On 7 November 2008, at the National Theatre to promote his book The Writer's Tale, Doctor Who writer Russell T Davies said that Eccleston's contract was for a single year because it was uncertain whether the show would continue beyond a single revival series. In retrospect, he says, it has been an enormous success, but at the time there were doubts within the BBC. Eccleston was voted "Most Popular Actor" at the 2005 National Television Awards for his portrayal of the Doctor.

In July 2012, Eccleston spoke positively of his time on Doctor Who during a talk at the National Theatre. This led to speculation he was considering making a return appearance as the Doctor for the show's 50th anniversary special, "The Day of the Doctor", in 2013. Matt Smith, who portrayed the Eleventh Doctor, stated that he would have loved Eccleston to return. However, after discussions with executive producer Steven Moffat, Eccleston declined his role. However, in a 2018 interview Eccleston said that the BBC had "put [him] on a blacklist" when he left.

Eccleston began appearing as a guest at Doctor Who conventions for the first time in 2018. He had previously expressed his reluctance to appear at conventions, saying in 2017 that he preferred to "just earn [his] living by acting". He has since said that his experience of meeting fans at conventions "healed something in [him]" and made him re-evaluate his relationship to the series.

On 9 August 2020, it was announced that Eccleston would reprise his role of the Ninth Doctor in audio dramas for Big Finish Productions, across four boxsets to be released between May 2021 and February 2022. This would be the first time he had portrayed the role in 16 years. Eccleston was later confirmed to appear in a further four boxsets, releasing in 2022 and 2023. However, he has said that it is unlikely that he will reprise the role on television for the 60th Anniversary, as his relationship with the BBC "has not healed". However, it was announced in November 2022 that he is set to appear in Big Finish's eight part audio 60th anniversary: "Once and Future"

Later work (2005–present)

On 30 October 2005, Eccleston appeared on stage at The Old Vic theatre in London in the one-night play Night Sky alongside Navin Chowdhry, Bruno Langley, David Warner, Saffron Burrows and David Baddiel. Eccleston sat on the 2nd Amazonas International Film Festival Film Jury in November 2005. The Canadian born director Norman Jewison was chairman of the Jury. In December 2005, Eccleston travelled to Indonesia's Aceh province for the BBC Breakfast news programme, examining how survivors of the 2004 Boxing Day tsunami were rebuilding their lives.

In March 2006, Eccleston appeared in the ITV documentary special Best Ever Muppet Moments as a commentator. In May 2006, he appeared as the narrator in a production of Romeo and Juliet at the Lowry theatre in his home city of Salford. The theatre company with which he performed, Celebrity Pig (of which he is patron), is made up of learning disabled actors. In August 2006, Eccleston filmed New Orleans, Mon Amour with Elisabeth Moss. The film was directed by Michael Almereyda and shot in post-Hurricane Katrina New Orleans. It was released in 2008 to film festivals in America and Italy.

Late in 2006 he starred in Perfect Parents, an ITV drama written and directed by Joe Ahearne, who had directed him in Doctor Who. Eccleston joined the cast of the NBC TV series Heroes in the episode "Godsend", which was broadcast on 22 January 2007. Eccleston played a character named Claude who has the power of invisibility, and helps Peter Petrelli with his powers. Eccleston appeared as the Rider in a film adaptation of Susan Cooper's novel The Dark Is Rising, which opened in the USA on 5 October 2007.

Eccleston appeared on the BBC Four World Cinema Award show in February 2008, arguing the merits of five international hits such as The Lives of Others and Pan's Labyrinth with Jonathan Ross and Archie Panjabi. In 2009, Eccleston starred opposite Archie Panjabi in a short film called The Happiness Salesman. Eccleston agreed to do the film because of Panjabi and the fact that it was a winner of the British Short Screenplay Competition. He also appeared as the villainous Destro in the G.I. Joe film, G.I. Joe: The Rise of Cobra. That same year, Eccleston also appeared in an episode of The Sarah Silverman Program and starred in the film Amelia as Fred Noonan alongside Richard Gere, Hilary Swank and Ewan McGregor.

Eccleston was cast as John Lennon in a BBC production called Lennon Naked which aired in the UK on 23 June 2010, with Eccleston playing the title role, and Naoko Mori, who had previously appeared with him in Doctor Who, as Yoko Ono. In November 2010, Eccleston starred in the first episode of BBC One anthology drama Accused. He won an International Emmy Award for his role. In May 2011, he starred as Joseph Bede in The Shadow Line, a seven-part television drama serial for BBC Two.

On 31 December 2011, Eccleston played the role of Pod Clock in an adaptation of Mary Norton's children's novel The Borrowers on BBC One. In July 2012, he starred in the political thriller Blackout on BBC One. In the same month, he starred as Creon in an adaptation of Antigone at the Royal National Theatre; his performance in the play was called "charismatic" and "intense". In September 2012, Eccleston starred in the film Song for Marion, also known as Unfinished Song with Terence Stamp.

In 2013, Eccleston portrayed the villainous Malekith in Thor: The Dark World, the sequel to Thor and the eighth instalment in the Marvel Cinematic Universe. Later that year, he played John Aspinall in Lucan, a mini-series about the disappearance of Lord Lucan. From 2014 to 2017, Eccleston starred as Reverend Matt Jamison on the HBO drama series The Leftovers and earned consistent acclaim for his performance across all three seasons. In 2015, Eccleston starred in the television series Fortitude as a scientist based in Arctic Norway alongside Stanley Tucci and Michael Gambon before he and Marsha Thomason played a married couple who own a guest house in the Lake District in the series Safe House. Later in 2015, Eccleston starred as
Leonard "Nipper" Read in Legend, a film about the Kray twins, opposite Tom Hardy.

In 2016, Eccleston began appearing as Maurice Scott in the BBC drama The A Word. Maurice is the eccentric but lovable dad to his daughter who, with her husband, has an autistic son. The second series began airing in November 2017 both in the UK and the US, where The A Word airs on Sundance TV. A third series was confirmed and aired in the spring of 2020.

Eccleston played the lead role in the Royal Shakespeare Company's production of Macbeth in 2018. The production was streamed on BBC Four. Also in 2018, Eccleston starred in two films; opposite Tom Wilkinson as crime boss Harvey in Dead in a Week or Your Money Back and as a Nazi officer Heinz in Where Hands Touch. That same year he appeared in King Lear as Oswald and in the television mini-series Come Home, the latter of which he was nominated for an Emmy Award for Best Actor. In 2021, Eccleston starred in the six-part television mini-series Close to Me.

Further upcoming projects include playing Fagin in the series Dodger and in a television adaptation of the award-winning novel My Name is Leon.

Personal life
Eccleston married Mischka, a copywriter, in November 2011. Their first child, a son named Albert, was born in February 2012. Their second child, a daughter named Esme, was born in 2013. They were divorced in December 2015.

Eccleston is a lifelong supporter of Manchester United, and was a regular marathon runner until 2000.

In September 2007, as part of a £9.5 million building project, Salford's Pendleton College named its new 260-seat auditorium the Eccleston Theatre.

Eccleston became a Mencap charity ambassador on 28 April 2005, and is a supporter of the British Red Cross. He also supports research for Alzheimer's disease and other forms of dementia; his father, Ronnie, had vascular dementia in his later years, from 1998 until his death in 2012.

In his autobiography, Eccleston described chronic eating disorders and depression, and said that he had considered suicide. Speaking about his poor mental health, he wrote that he was "a lifelong body hater".

Eccleston is an atheist.

Politics
In politics, Eccleston has criticised the Conservative Party and expressed concern at opportunities for actors from his background to achieve his level of success in the future. He said in July 2017, "It's always been a policy of the Conservative government and party to destroy working class identity. If you prevent them from having a cultural voice, which is what's happening, they achieve that. They hate us, they want to destroy us, so we're being ruled out of having a voice."

Eccleston endorsed Labour Party incumbent Andy Burnham in the 2021 Greater Manchester mayoral election.

Eccleston is a British republican who supports the abolition of the British monarchy.

Filmography

Film

Television

Stage

Performances with unknown dates
 Woyzeck – Birmingham Repertory Theatre
 The Wonder – Gate Theatre
 Encounters – National Theatre Studio

Short films

Music videos

Radio and narration

Audio dramas

Books

Awards and nominations

BAFTA Awards

BAFTA TV Awards

BAFTA Cymru Awards

Emmy Awards

International Emmy Awards

Others

Notes

References

External links
 
 
 

20th-century English people
1964 births
20th-century English male actors
21st-century English male actors
Alumni of the Royal Central School of Speech and Drama
Alumni of the University of Salford
English atheists
English male film actors
English male radio actors
English male stage actors
English male television actors
International Emmy Award for Best Actor winners
Living people
Male actors from Salford
Male actors from Lancashire
People from Pendleton, Greater Manchester
Royal Shakespeare Company members
Labour Party (UK) people
English republicans